Hinduism is the second largest religion in Sindh, comprising 8.73% of its population. Sindh has the largest population and the highest percentage of Hindus in Pakistan. The Sindh hosts the Shri Ramapir Temple whose annual festival is the second largest Hindu pilgrimage in Pakistan, after the Hinglaj Yatra (the largest Hindu pilgrimage in Pakistan).

History
The Sindh region and its rulers play an important role in the Hindu epic of Mahabharata. Hinduism along with Buddhism was the predominant religion in Sindh before the Arab Islamic conquest. At that time multiple Hindu castes and communities resided in the Sindh. Many ancient Hindu temples exist today from ancient era and many Hindu dynasties, including Gupta, Pala, Kushan and Hindu Shahis ruled the region before the conquest of Muhammad ibn Qasim, who led the Umayyad army for Islamic conquest of Sindh. The region had still then a Hindu-majority, but the repeated campaign and persecution by Delhi Sultanate lead to gradual decrease in Hindus and growth of Muslims, and Hindus became minority in the region at the time of Mughal Empire.

After the formation of Pakistan, the majority of the Hindus migrated to India, still the biggest population of Hindus is in Sindh.

Demographics
According to the 2017 Census, there are 4.18 million Hindus in Sindh constituting 8.73% of its population including 83,000 (1.74%) Scheduled caste Hindus. However the proportion of scheduled caste Hindus is actually higher as they categorize themselves as Hindus in the census rather than as Scheduled Caste Hindu. According to the Pakistan Hindu Council estimates that there are 6.8 million Hindus in Sindh.

According to the Election Commission of Pakistan, Hindu voters were 49% of the total in Umerkot and 46% in Tharparkar. According to the voter estimation, the Hindus have a population of 50,000 or more in 11 districts. All of these are in Sindh except the Rahim Yar Khan District in Punjab.

Umerkot district (52.15%) in Sindh is the only Hindu majority district in Pakistan. Tharparkar district of Sindh has the highest population of Hindus in terms of absolute terms in a district. The four districts of Umerkot, Tharparkar, Mirpurkhas and Sanghar in Sindh hosts more than half of the Hindu population in Pakistan.

All districts in Sindh with a Hindu population greater than 1%, according to the 2017 census is given below. In other districts the population of Hindus is less than 1%.

Community life

Many Hindus, especially in the rural areas of Sindh, follow the teachings of the 14th-century saint Ramdevji, whose main temple Shri Ramdev Pir temple is located in Tando Allahyar. A growing number of urban Hindu youth in Pakistan associate themselves with ISKCON society. Other communities worship manifold "Mother Goddesses" as their clan or family patrons. Many Hindus in Sindh revere Guru Nanak, the founder of Sikhism along with Hindu gods. A large fraction of Sindhi Hindus consider themselves Nanakpanthi.

Pakistani Hindus who can't afford the trip to India to release their loved ones' remains into the Ganges, go to Churrio Jabal Durga Mata temple in Nagarparkar. According to a study, the majority of the scheduled caste Hindus (91.5% ) in Tharparkar and Umerkot districts of Sindh faced discrimination and believed that political parties are not giving importance to them. Forced conversion of Hindu girls are a major problem faced by Hindus in Sindh and such cases are being reported increasingly in the Southern Sindh districts of Tharparkar, Umerkot and Mirpur Khas. Sindh is also the only province in Pakistan to have a separate law for governing Hindu marriages.

In Sindh provincial assembly, 10 seats reserved for minorities. In 2018, Krishna Kumari Kohli, a Hindu woman from Sindh became the first non-Muslim woman to win a women's reserved seat in Senate of Pakistan. In 2018, Pakistan general election Mahesh Kumar Malani became the first Hindu candidate who won a general seat in Pakistan National Assembly 2018. He won the seat from Tharparkar-II and thus became the first non-Muslim to win a general seat (non-reserved) in Pakistan national assembly. In the Sindh provincial assembly election which took place along with the Pakistan National Assembly election 2018, Hari Ram Kishori Lal and Giyan Chand Essrani were elected from the Sindh provincial assembly seats. They became the first non-Muslims to win a general seat (non-reserved) in a provincial assembly election.

Temples

See also
 Hinduism in Balochistan
 Hinduism in Punjab, Pakistan
 Sindhi Hindus
 Hinduism in Khyber Pakhtunkhwa

References

Citations

Bibliography

External links 
 

Religion in Pakistan by administrative unit